Reginald Thomas Hooper (February 27, 1879 – May 3, 1958) was an English-born Canadian professional ice hockey player. He played with the Quebec Bulldogs of the National Hockey Association during the 1910–11 season.

He was the older brother of Archie Hooper.

References

External links
Reginald Hooper at JustSportsStats

1879 births
1958 deaths
Canadian ice hockey forwards
Quebec Bulldogs (NHA) players
British emigrants to Canada